Costa Rica competed at the 2004 Summer Paralympics in Athens, Greece. The team included one athlete, but won no medals.

Sports

Swimming

See also
Costa Rica at the Paralympics
Costa Rica at the 2004 Summer Olympics

References 

Nations at the 2004 Summer Paralympics
2004
Summer Paralympics